John McKenzie may refer to:

Arts and entertainment
 John McKenzie (painter) (1831–1909), Scottish painter
 John Patrick McKenzie (born 1962), American artist is San Francisco
 John McKenzie (director), director of 1996 British comedy film Vol-au-vent
 John McKenzie (musician), British bass player active since 1970

Politics
 John McKenzie (New Zealand politician) (1839–1901), New Zealand politician
 John C. McKenzie (1860–1941), American representative from Illinois
 John D. McKenzie (1889–1952), American-born businessman and political figure in Nova Scotia

Sports
 John McKenzie (Australian footballer) (1885–1971), played for Geelong in 1906
 John McKenzie (Australian cricketer) (1862-1944), Australian cricketer
 John McKenzie (New Zealand cricketer) (fl. 1893–95), New Zealand cricketer
 John McKenzie (ice hockey) (1937–2018), Canadian ice hockey player
 John McKenzie (American football), American football player and coach
 Johnny McKenzie (footballer) (fl. 1930s), Scottish footballer (Third Lanark, Aberdeen)
 John McKenzie (wrestler)

Other
 John W.P. McKenzie (died 1853), American missionary to the Choctaws and founder of McKenzie College in Texas
 John McKenzie (philanthropist) (1876–1955), New Zealand businessman
 John McKenzie (trade unionist) (1885-1958), Scottish trade unionist
 John L. McKenzie (1910–1991), American Catholic theologian
 John Grant McKenzie, Scottish Congregational minister, psychologist and academic

See also
 John Mackenzie (disambiguation)
 Jack McKenzie (disambiguation)